Godless is an American Western drama streaming television miniseries created, written and directed by Scott Frank. In the series, set in 1884, a young outlaw on the run from his vengeful mentor winds up in a small New Mexico town populated almost entirely by women. The seven-episode series began production in Santa Fe, New Mexico, in September 2016, and was released on Netflix globally on November 22, 2017. The series received positive reviews, and was named one of the year's 10 best by The Washington Post and Vanity Fair.

Cast

Main
 Jack O'Connell as Roy Goode, an injured outlaw on the run from his former boss, Frank Griffin. He was orphaned at a young age and was taken in by Griffin. He ultimately breaks up a robbery and takes off with the loot, splitting from his father figure after he no longer can stomach Griffin's behavior.
 Michelle Dockery as Alice Fletcher, an independent and aloof widow managing a small ranch with her mother-in-law and adolescent son.
 Scoot McNairy as Bill McNue, the sheriff of La Belle and brother of Mary Agnes.
 Merritt Wever as Mary Agnes McNue, the sheriff's determined, pragmatic and intrepid sister. The widow of the late mayor of La Belle, a town where almost all of the men have died in a mining accident, falls in love with another woman: Callie Dunne, ex-prostitute and current schoolteacher.
 Thomas Brodie-Sangster as Whitey Winn, the town deputy who is devoted to the town and the sheriff and afraid of no one.
 Tantoo Cardinal as Iyovi, Alice's Paiute mother-in-law.
 Kim Coates as Ed Logan, an arrogant and abrasive company man who comes into La Belle.
 Sam Waterston as Marshal John Cook, the law in Santa Fe who is on the hunt for Griffin.
 Jeff Daniels as Frank Griffin, a menacing outlaw who is terrorizing the West as he hunts down Roy, his son-like partner turned mortal enemy.

Recurring
 Samuel Marty as Truckee, Alice's son.
 Tess Frazer as Callie Dunne, a former prostitute, current schoolteacher and lover of Mary Agnes McNue.
 Samantha Soule as Charlotte Temple, a nervous and put-together woman always in her Sunday best.
 Audrey Moore as Sarah Doyle, a randy woman in her thirties dying for a man's company.
 Jeremy Bobb as A.T. Grigg, the editor of the Santa Fe Daily Review, who has been obsessed for years with writing about the Griffin Gang.
 Adam David Thompson as Gatz Brown, Griffin's righthand man. 
 Russell Dennis Lewis as Daryl Devlin, murderous twin brother of Donnie in Griffin's gang of outlaws.
 Matthew Dennis Lewis as Donnie Devlin, murderous twin brother of Daryl in Griffin's gang of outlaws.
 Joe Pingue as Alonzo Bunker, a member of Griffin's gang of outlaws.
 Justin Welborn as Floyd Wilson, a skillful tracker in Griffin's gang of outlaws.
 Keith Jardine as Dyer Howe, a member of Griffin's gang of outlaws who is especially useful with knives.
 Christiane Seidel as Martha Bischoff, a mysterious German woman who raises some suspicion in La Belle.
 Nathan Darrow as Webster, a Pinkerton man searching for Martha.
 Kayli Carter as Sadie Rose, a widow of La Belle.
 Russell G. Jones as Hiram, one of the only surviving men of La Belle.
 Randy Oglesby as Asa Leopold, one of the only surviving men of La Belle who runs the dry goods store.
 Duane Howard as Shoshone Brave, a mysterious figure with a dog companion who is trailing Bill McNue.
 Jessica Sula as Louise Hobbs, Whitey's love interest and a skilled violinist.
 Erik LaRay Harvey as Elias Hobbs, Louise's father and a Civil War veteran.
 Rob Morgan as John Randall, a 10th US Cavalry's veteran. The character is loosely based on the same-named Indian Wars' hero, who is said (by legend) to have single-handed killed 13 Cheyenne warriors, so 'fathering' the creation of the American-Native's term 'buffalo soldiers'.
 Julian Grey as William McNue, Bill's son.
 Marie Wagenman as Trudy McNue, Bill's daughter.
 Marceline Hugot as Lucy Cole, a nun who cares for Roy and his older brother when they were children.

Guest
 Christopher Fitzgerald as J.J. Valentine, the smooth talking president of the Quicksilver Mining Company looking to take over the mine in La Belle.
 Whitney Able as Anna McNue, Bill McNue's deceased wife, who died giving birth to their daughter.

Production
The series was filmed in New Mexico, primarily on location, although the production was based at Santa Fe Studios. The town of La Belle, with a full 28 buildings, was constructed at the San Cristobal Ranch near Lamy. Other locations included Bonanza Creek Ranch in Santa Fe, Santa Clara Pueblo, a location near Abiquiú, Diablo Canyon near Los Alamos, El Rancho de las Golondrinas in Santa Fe, Cherry Meadow near Pecos, Jemez Pueblo, and the Galisteo ranch; the latter, in the Galisteo Basin outside Santa Fe, also known as Cerro Pelon Ranch, was the location for the town of Creede, attacked by the Griffin gang.

According to one source, the final shot of the series, set on the California coast in a fictionalized version of Atascadero, California, was filmed near Big Sur, California, but inland, not on the coast. Filming commenced in September 2016 and continued for five months.

Episodes

Reception

Critical response
The series received positive reviews. Review aggregator website Rotten Tomatoes gave it an 83% rating and average rating of 7.9 out of 10, based on 80 reviews, with critics consensus, "Vistas and violence root Godless firmly in traditional Western territory, but its female-driven ensemble sets it apart in a male-dominated genre." On Metacritic, it has a score of 75 out of 100, based on 25 reviews, indicating "generally favorable reviews".

Alan Sepinwall from Uproxx reviewed it positively, saying, "Godless doesn’t quite find that happy middle, but the storytelling excesses created by this format make it more fun than the traditional movie version probably would have been."

Vanity Fair and The Washington Post included Godless on their "best shows of 2017" lists.

Awards and nominations

Critics' Choice Television Awards

Directors Guild of America Awards

GLAAD Media Awards

Primetime Emmy Awards

Screen Actors Guild Awards

Writers Guild of America Awards

References

External links
 
 
 History of Blackdom

2017 American television series debuts
2017 American television series endings
2010s American drama television miniseries
2010s Western (genre) television series
English-language Netflix original programming
Fiction set in 1884
Serial drama television series
Television series created by Scott Frank
Television series set in the 1880s
Television shows set in Colorado
Television shows set in New Mexico
Television shows filmed in New Mexico
Primetime Emmy Award-winning television series